Cantell School is a secondary comprehensive school in Bassett, Southampton. In 2013, Ofsted judged Cantell to be a 'Good' school.

History
The school occupies the site that was previously home to Glen Eyre School.  Cantell was formed as an amalgamation of Hampton Park Secondary School and Glen Eyre Secondary School. In 1988 the school occupied an area of some 4 hectares (9.9 acres) and it was proposed that 0.1 hectares (0.25 acres) of this be sold off for housing.

The School gained specialist status for Mathematics and Information and Communication Technology, in September 2003 and was known as Cantell Mathematics and Computing College until 2013, when the school returned to the original name of Cantell School.

Cantell Secondary received an Ofsted inspection in Autumn 2004 and was put into the special measures category because it was failing to give its students an acceptable standard of education. As a result, it received visits from Her Majesty's Inspectorate of Education to inspect its progress. The school came out of special measures after the June 2006 inspection.

Present 

The school achieved improvements in Ofsted judgements, and in 2013, achieved its best ever GCSE results (69% 5A*-C including English and Maths), and topped the City league tables for students' progress (Value Added). In the same year the school was judged Good.

In January 2006 there were 1,177 students at Cantell (532 boys and 645 girls), below the full capacity of 1,300.

Cantell is home to a diverse community and offers over 60 different clubs and societies. It is also one of the only schools in Hampshire to offer Latin as part of the timetable.

Facilities
The main school building was completed in 2003 at the cost of £15 million , replacing the previous East and West buildings which were constructed in the 1940s, and which were in a state of disrepair. The school's sports hall along with a small electricity sub-station were the only parts of the old school to survive the rebuild.

Notable former pupils
Will Champion, drummer for Coldplay
 Joe Jerome Newman, lead singer of alt-J and amateur boxer
Wade Elliott, footballer
Sam Hoskins, footballer
Louisa Rose Allen, singer and songwriter

References

External links 
 The school's website
 The school on Ofsted's website

 

Secondary schools in Southampton
Foundation schools in Southampton